The following lists events that have happened in 1831 in the Qajar dynasty.

Incumbents
 Monarch: Fat′h-Ali Shah Qajar

Birth
 July 16 – Naser al-Din Shah Qajar born in Tabriz

References

 
Iran
Years of the 19th century in Iran
1830s in Iran
Iran